Bizarre Bunch is a South Korean television series. The series is also known in English as Peculiar Man, Eccentric Woman, Bizarre Family and Odd Man and Woman.

Synopsis
The story follows an extended family's love dilemmas, family arguments and family secrets.

Production
The series was produced by Lee Duk-gun and ran for 170 episodes. It was broadcast in South Korea from September 26, 2005, to May 19, 2006.

Cast
 Jung Joon
 Kang In-duk
 Kim Ah-joong
 Kim Sung-eun
 Kim Hae-sook
 Kim Young-ok
 Go Joo-won
 Sun Ji-hyun

See also
 Korean drama
 List of South Korean television series

References

External links
 Official website

Korean Broadcasting System television dramas
2005 South Korean television series debuts
2006 South Korean television series endings
Korean-language television shows
South Korean romance television series